The Quilt Treasures Project is an oral history project that documents the stories of a number of notable individuals who were instrumental in moving the 20th Century Quilt Revival forward in some significant way.  These individuals include:
 quilt makers
 designers
 business people
 collectors
 historians and other scholars
 publishers

Quilt Treasures seeks to make this documentary material available in two different kinds of media:
 digitally on the web through web portraits
 mini-documentaries in archival form in a museum repository

These online portraits are intended for the use of researchers and students in the field of quilt history and have been featured in both scholarly publications, such as Uncoverings, the academic journal of the American Quilt Study Group, and popular magazines for quilters, including the Quilter's Newsletter.  The project is a collaboration of the Alliance for American Quilts, the Michigan State University Museum, and MATRIX: Center for Humane Arts, Letters, and Social Sciences OnLine.

Web portraits

The Quilt Treasures web portraits feature biographies and videotaped interviews, mini-documentaries, photos, a timeline of activities, bibliographies and other resources relating to each individual. Other components have been developed as needed based on the interviewee’s life and work. These components have included testimonies from friends and/or colleagues, exhibit histories, teaching portfolios, and poetry.  Individuals currently documented with web portraits include:

 Virginia Avery
 Cuesta Benberry, scholar on the history of African American quilting
 Jinny Beyer, professional quilter and fabric designer
 David and Patricia Crosby, founders of Mississippi Cultural Crossroads
 Joyce Gross, editor and publisher, The Quilt Journal (1977–1987)
 Bonnie Leman, founder of Quilter's Newsletter Magazine
 Jean Ray Laury
 Yvonne Porcella
 Bets Ramsey, co-founder of the Tennessee Quilt Project
 Hystercine Rankin
 Mary Schafer
 Merry Silber
 Woodard and Greenstein

Impact

Many of the individuals documented as Quilt Treasures have had wide-reaching impacts not only within the quilting world, but beyond the field of quilting and quilt history.  Cuesta Benberry, for example, was a noted scholar of African American history and culture.  Scholars of oral history use the documentaries produced by this project to document and understand various aspects of American culture.  One of the most popular min-documentaries, "On Pimento cheese sandwiches," provides insight into an aspect of Southern culture and foodways.

Quotes

According to Alliance for American Quilts co-founder Shelly Zegart:  "Quilt Treasures are the special women and men who were key to the American quilt revival of the 1960s and 1970s, reawakening interest nationwide in the history, craft, and social and aesthetic value of quilts. They ensured the preservation and documentation of quilts through the state and regional quilt projects and they took quilting as a cultural expression to new heights. As creators, teachers, communicators, and links in a growing network, these 'quilt treasures' built an art form and an industry that today involves and touches millions of Americans. As these individuals began to retire from active involvement in the quilt world, an important piece of American social and cultural history was at risk of being lost." (Zegart, 2003)

See also

 The Quilt Index
 Quilters Hall of Fame

References

 
 
  
 Zegart, Shelly. Press release jointly issued by The Alliance for American Quilts and Michigan State University, February 2003.

Further reading

External links
 centerforthequilt.org

Quilting
American documentary films
Oral history